Caged Fury is a 1948 American drama film directed by William Berke and written by David Lang. The film stars Richard Denning, Sheila Ryan, Mary Beth Hughes, Buster Crabbe and Frank Wilcox. The film was released on March 5, 1948 by Paramount Pictures.

Plot

Dan Corey's circus employs a pair of lion tamers, Blaney and Smiley, whose act also includes Smiley's sweetheart Lola Tremaine and a ferocious lion known as Sultan.

Lola is jealous of another circus performer, Kit Warren, a horseback rider Blaney has been seeing. A scheme by Smiley results in Lola's being trapped inside the cage and mauled to death by the lion.

Kit wants to replace Lola in the act. She begins to learn the lion-taming act but breaks up with Blaney in the process. Smiley is attracted to her and decides to do away with Blaney once and for all. He begins to abuse Sultan, dressing like Blaney in the hope of turning the lion against the other man. After he is caught red-handed by circus owner Corey in his sinister plot, Smiley kills Corey, but while speeding away, Smiley's car goes over a cliff.

A year later, Blaney and Kit are doing the lion-taming act when Smiley suddenly reappears. He had leapt from the car just in time. Now he's come back to murder Blaney, but during their violent fight, Smiley is fatally attacked by the lion.

Cast 
Richard Denning as Blaney Lewis
Sheila Ryan as Kit Warren
Mary Beth Hughes as Lola Tremaine
Buster Crabbe as Smiley
Frank Wilcox as Dan Corey

References

External links 
 
Review of film at Variety

1948 films
1940s English-language films
Paramount Pictures films
American drama films
1948 drama films
Films directed by William A. Berke
American black-and-white films
Circus films
1940s American films